Karl Vollmöller (16 October 1848, in Ilsfeld, Württemberg – 8 July 1922, in Dresden) was a German philologist.

He was educated in Tübingen, Bonn, Munich, Berlin, and Paris. He traveled in Spain in 1874-75 and became a lecturer in Strassburg in 1875. He was professor at Erlangen (1877–81), and then at Göttingen until 1891, when he retired, settled in Dresden, and devoted himself to Romance philology.

Works
He was editor of Kritischer Jahresbericht über die Fortschritte der romanischen Philologie, an annual compilation (Critical annual report on the progress of Romance philology; 1890 et seq.) In 1902 he founded the Die Gesellschaft für romanische Literatur. He published:
 Kürenberg und die Nibelungen (1874).
 Poema del Cid (1879).
 Spanische Funde (1890).
 Beiträge zur Litteratur der Cancioneros und Romanceros (1897).
 Rezensionsexemplar und bezahlte Rezension (1902).

Family
His nephew Karl Gustav Vollmoeller was a noted screenwriter.

Notes

References
 

German philologists
University of Tübingen alumni
Academic staff of the University of Göttingen
People from Heilbronn (district)
1848 births
1922 deaths